These are Oriente Petrolero matches in South America.

Matches in

References
 Oriente en la Copa Libertadores
 Oriente historia y futbol
 Oriente en Copa Sudamericana

External links

Oriente Petrolero